This is a list of African-American newspapers that have been published in South Carolina.  It includes both current and historical newspapers.  More than 130 such newspapers were published in the state between 1865 and 1970.  The first was the South Carolina Leader, established at Charleston in 1865. In the 19th and early 20th centuries, the growth of the African-American press in South Carolina was hampered by the fact that a large proportion of South Carolina African Americans lived in poverty in the countryside.

Newspapers

See also 

List of African-American newspapers and media outlets
List of African-American newspapers in Georgia
List of African-American newspapers in North Carolina
List of newspapers in South Carolina

Works cited

References 

Newspapers
South Carolina
African-American
African-American newspapers